, also known as Seiryō Hamada, was a Japanese academic, archaeologist, author and President of Kyoto University.

Early life
Hamada was born in Osaka. He was educated at the University of Tokyo and Kyoto University; and he studied in England.

Career
In 1917, Hamada was the first archaeology professor at the Kyoto University; and he is credited with the introduction of modern research methods in Japan. His fieldwork included archaeological digs in Japan, Korea and China.

At the pinnacle of his academic career, Hamada was installed as university president in 1937.

Selected works
In a statistical overview derived from writings by and about Kōsaku Hamada, OCLC/WorldCat encompasses roughly 100+ works in 200+ publications in 3 languages and 1,000+ library holdings.

 有竹齋藏古玉譜 (1925)
 百済観音 (1926)
 支那古明器泥象圖說 (1927)
 Pʼi-tzu-wo; prehistoric sites by the river Pi-liu-ho, South Manchuria (1929)
 東亞文明の黎明 (1930)
 東亞考古學研究 (1930)
 天正遣歐使節記 (1931)
 南山裡: 南滿洲老鐵山麓の漢代甎墓 Nan-shan-li: Brick-tombs of the Han dynasty at the foot of Mt. Lao-t'ieh, South Manchuria (1933)
 營城子: 前牧城驛附近の漢代壁晝甎墓 Ying-ch'êng-tzŭ (1934)
 删訂泉屋清賞 (1934)
 新羅古瓦の研究 (1934)
 古物硏究 (1936)
 日本美術史硏究 (1940)

Articles
 "Chifeng Hongshanhou," Archaeologia Orientalis, ser. A, No. 6. Far-Eastern Archaeology Society of Japan, (1938).

Notes

References
 Nussbaum, Louis-Frédéric and Käthe Roth. (2005).  Japan encyclopedia. Cambridge: Harvard University Press. ;  OCLC 58053128

External links
 "Japanese-Korean Relationships in 4th Century," The Japan-Korea Cultural Foundation, 2005

Japanese archaeologists
University of Tokyo alumni
Presidents of Kyoto University
Academic staff of Kyoto University
1881 births
1938 deaths
20th-century archaeologists